The University of South Wales is a public university in Wales, with campuses in Cardiff, Newport and Pontypridd. It was formed on 11 April 2013 from the merger of the University of Glamorgan and the University of Wales, Newport. The university is the second largest university in Wales in terms of its student numbers, and offers around 500 undergraduate and postgraduate courses. The university has three main faculties across its campuses in South Wales.

History
The university can trace its roots to the founding of the Newport Mechanics' Institute in 1841. The Newport Mechanics' Institute later become the University of Wales, Newport. In 1913 the South Wales and Monmouthshire School of Mines was formed. The school of mines was later to become the Polytechnic of Wales, before gaining the status of University of Glamorgan in 1992. The name for the new merged university was chosen following a research exercise amongst interested parties and announced in December 2012 by the prospective vice-chancellor of the university, Julie Lydon, who retired in 2021.

In 2020 the university entered a strategic alliance with the University of Wales Trinity Saint David through a deed of association. A joint statement said that the two universities would be "working together on a national mission to strengthen Wales’ innovation capacity, supporting economic regeneration and the renewal of its communities", while retaining their autonomy and distinct identities.

Notable dates
 1841 Opening of Mechanics Institute, Newport
 1913 Opening of South Wales and Monmouthshire School of Mines, Treforest
 2013 Merger between the University of Glamorgan and the University of Wales, Newport
 2014 Rowan Williams appointed Chancellor
 2015 London Campus closes
 2016 Caerleon Campus closes
 2020 Dubai Campus closes

Student numbers
At formation it was reported that the university had more than 33,500 students from 122 countries and was then the sixth largest in the United Kingdom and the largest in Wales. Following the decline in student numbers reported by the Higher Education Statistics Agency (HESA) over the years since the formation of the university, for the academic year  the university ranking was  largest in the UK and the  second largest in Wales when measured by the numbers of students enrolled.

Source:- The Higher Education Statistics Agency

Organisation

Associated organisations
The university is part of the University of South Wales Group comprising the university, the Royal Welsh College of Music and Drama and the Merthyr Tydfil College.

The university has a band of 106 partner colleges, universities, FE institutions or organisations, who deliver University of South Wales's higher education programmes or access courses in the UK and 18 other countries.

Faculties

The university has three faculties spread over its campuses in South East Wales.

Faculty of Computing, Engineering and Science
 School of Computing and Mathematics
 School of Engineering
 School of Applied Sciences
Faculty of Business & Creative Industries
 School of Design & Digital
 School of Production & Performance
 South Wales Business School
Faculty of Life Sciences and Education
 School of Psychology and Therapeutic Studies
 School of Education, Early Years and Social Work
 School of Health, Sport & Professional Practice
 School of Care Sciences

The university has a film school, animation facilities, broadcasting studios, a photography school, poets, scriptwriters and authors as well as the national music and drama conservatoire, the Royal Welsh College of Music and Drama, as a wholly owned subsidiary. It offers a range of qualifications from further education to degrees to PhD study. As a Post 92 University it delivers a range of STEM subjects.

Campuses

The university has three main campuses located in South Wales:

Cardiff
The Faculty of Business & Creative Industries is based at the Cardiff Campus. The Atrium Building is the only building at the campus, originally opened by the University of Glamorgan in 2007 the building was extended at a cost of £14.7 million to replace the Caerleon campus. The building re-opened during September 2016. The campus also included the Atlantic House building, which was closed due to declining student numbers.

Newport
The university's newest campus is the £40 million campus on the west bank of the River Usk in Newport city centre. The 'City Campus' was built for the University of Wales, Newport and was opened in 2011 by Sir Terry Matthews. Originally built to house a variety of undergraduate and postgraduate courses for the Newport Business School, Newport Film School and the university's art and design department, it now hosts departments and courses primarily from the Faculty of Life Sciences and Education, including teaching, social work and youth work as well as some courses in business together with the National Cyber Security Academy.

Pontypridd
This was formerly the main campus of the University of Glamorgan. Currently the university's largest campus, with a range of facilities, including an indoor sports centre and students' union. The campus is located in three parts:-

1) Treforest – Which hosts the School of Engineering, School of Computing and Mathematics and the South Wales Business School. The university's graduate school, main library and administrative departments are based on the Treforest site. 

2) Glyntaff   – Where nursing and science departments are based. The campus is divided into Lower Glyntaff, where nursing is focused and Upper Glyntaff where Applied Sciences is based. The Alfred Russel Wallace building, named after the Welsh naturalist, is an impressive example of South Wales architecture, having been an Edwardian boys grammar school and built in typical dramatic style.

3) Sport Park – in the Treforest Industrial Estate, the location of several teaching spaces and facilities for sports courses.

Former campuses

Caerleon
Caerleon is located on the northern outskirts of Newport. Formerly the second largest campus, it hosted a variety of undergraduate and postgraduate courses, including education, sports, history, fashion design, art and photography. The campus had extensive sports facilities, library, students' union shop and a students' union bar. It was formerly the main campus of the University of Wales, Newport. In 2014, it was announced by the University of South Wales that the Caerleon campus would close in 2016. The university cited the need to invest around £20 million to improve and upgrade facilities as the primary reason for its closure. The university relocated courses to the Newport City campus and the Cardiff Campus where it invested £14.7 million to extend and upgrade the Atrium building. The campus opened during 1914 and closed for the last time on 31 July 2016, after 102 years.

The university is proposing to sell the campus for housing development but there is strong opposition to the planned re-development from local residents. The Caerleon Civic Society asked Cadw, the body that looks after historic monuments and buildings in Wales, to give the Edwardian main building Grade II Listed building status to save it from demolition. On 7 August 2016 the Welsh Government announced that they would recommend that the main building, gatehouses and gate-piers be listed as 'buildings of special architectural and historic interest'. The University of South Wales expressed their continued opposition to the proposed listing but the announcement was welcomed by local politicians and the Caerleon Civic Society. Grade II listing of the Main Building, the Principal's Residence, Gate Piers and Caretaker's / Gardener's Lodge was confirmed on 3 March 2017.

Dubai, United Arab Emirates 
A new campus in Dubai was opened during September 2018 in Dubai South located near Al-Maktoum International Airport. The courses offered were British bachelor's degrees which include Aviation Maintenance Engineering and postgraduate courses including MSc International Logistics and Supply Chain Management.
From September 2020 it was announced that the campus would not accept further applications and would close. 
In 2018 the university was criticised by human rights campaigners when it awarded honorary doctorates to two senior figures in the UAE government, Ahmed bin Saeed Al Maktoum and Nahyan bin Mubarak Al Nahyan, at the campus' opening ceremony.

London
In 2014, USW spent an estimated £300,000 developing a campus in the Docklands area of London, but in January 2015 cancelled the project before taking on any students. The university described this as a test of the market, but cited problems created by new UK visa regulations.

Academic profile

Awards

The University of Wales, Newport received the 2013 Guardian Higher Education Award (with the University of Glamorgan) for widening participation through its Universities Heads of the Valleys Institute (UHOVI) initiative.
The University of Glamorgan was recognised for providing outstanding student support, winning the 2012 Times Higher Award for Outstanding Support to Students.

The former vice-chancellor of the university, Julie Lydon, was appointed an OBE for services to higher education in Wales in the 2014 Queen's Birthday Honours.

Rankings and reputation 

In 2017, the university entered the top five percent of universities in the world in the Times Higher Education World University Rankings.

In the 2017 National Student Survey the university was placed equal 140 out of 149 universities and institutions surveyed.

The Complete University Guide 2016/7 ranked the university as 99 out of 127 UK universities., however the ranking declined to 110 out of 129 UK Universities in 2017/8

The university came 81st in the 2022 What Uni Awards

The university did not participate in the 2017 Teaching Excellence Framework which is a government assessment of the quality of undergraduate teaching in universities and other higher education providers.

National Cyber Security Academy
In 2016, the university launched its National Cyber Security Academy. This academy is a joint venture with industrial partners and Welsh Government and has been recognised by the UK's national security organisation GCHQ.

Research
The university is one of Wales's five major universities and a member of the St David's Day Group. Its precursor institutions have been recognised for producing some world-leading and internationally excellent research in specialist areas, such as mechanical, aeronautical & manufacturing engineering, social work, social policy & administration, education, history, art and design, nursing and midwifery, architecture and the built environment, English language and literature, communication, cultural & media studies, sports-related studies.

The university has provided a partnership platform for think-tanks such as the Joseph Rowntree Foundation to develop debate on public policy reform in the UK.

The most recent Research Excellence Framework in 2021 found an overall improvement to the university's research performance, with a 49% increase in world leading research since 2014. The university is joint first in the UK for impactful research in Allied Health Professions, Dentistry, Nursing and Pharmacy; in Earth Systems and Environmental Sciences; in Computer Science and Informatics; in Sport and Exercise Sciences, Leisure, and Tourism; in History; in Music, Drama, Dance, Performing Arts, Film and Screen Studies and in Social Work and Social Policy.

Student life

Students' Union
University of South Wales Students' Union is the students' union of the university. It exists to support and represent the students of the university. It is a member-led organisation and all students are automatically members.

Accommodation
Pontypridd has halls of residence and facilities on its Treforest campus. Students studying at the university's Cardiff campus have access to private halls of residence, which are shared with the city's other universities. The Newport City building has nearby private student halls of residence.

Notable alumni

Artists and photographers 
 Roger Cecil, painter, mixed media artist
 Maciej Dakowicz, photographer and photojournalist
 Ken Elias, artist
 Tracey Moberly, interdisciplinary artist
 Tish Murtha, documentary photographer

Authors and creative writers
 Carole Bromley, poet
 Emma Darwin, novelist
 Philip Gross, poet, novelist, playwright and academic
 Paul Groves, poet
 Maria McCann, novelist
 Gareth L. Powell, science fiction author
 Dan Rhodes, writer
 Rachel Trezise, author
 Camilla Way, author
 Tine Wittler, writer and presenter

Business and legal
Joe Blackman, entrepreneur, Ambassador of The Princes Trust, CEO of Collection 26
 Christopher Chung Shu-kun, BBS, JP, member of Hong Kong Legislative Council 
Trudy Norris-Grey, Microsoft
Gemma Hallett, Entrepreneur and Founder of miFuture

Film
 Gareth Evans, film director and screenwriter
Philip John, director and screenwriter
Kirk Jones, film director and screenwriter
Asif Kapadia, film maker
Justin Kerrigan, writer and director
Teddy Soeriaatmadja, film director
 Peter Watkins-Hughes, BAFTA Cymru award-winning writer/director
Scott Barley, film maker

Healthcare professionals
 Sue Bale OBE, Director of South East Wales Academic Health Science Partnership
 Benjamin Cowley MBE, Music Therapist

Media personalities and performers
 Jayde Adams, comedian, actor, writer and singer
 Behnaz Akhgar, weather presenter
 Max Boyce MBE, entertainer
 Lorna Dunkley, newsreader and presenter
 Ben Green, comedy actor
 Harry Greene, television personality
 Mark Labbett, TV personality
 Nicola Miles-Wildin, performer

Musicians
 Richard James Burgess, producer, musician, digital music innovator
 Martin Goldschmidt, co-founder and managing director of UK independent record label Cooking Vinyl
 Mike Howlett, musician and music producer
 Jon Maguire, songwriter and former member of duo Lilygreen & Maguire
 Sion Russell Jones, singer and songwriter

 Ian Watkins, singer from rock band Lostprophets
 Holding Absence - UK Rock Band

Politicians
 Kevin Brennan, politician
 Suzy Davies
 Jill Evans, MEP for Wales
 Catherine Thomas
 Leanne Wood, former party leader of Plaid Cymru

Scientists
 Randii Wessen

Sports people
 Matthew Jarvis, rugby player
 Rupert Moon, rugby player and businessman
 Darren Morris, rugby player
Gemma Hallett, rugby union player
 Jamie Robinson, rugby player
 Nigel Walker, former Olympian and rugby player for Wales, National Director at the English Institute of Sport

See also
Armorial of UK universities
Education in Wales
List of universities in Wales
List of UK universities
Post-1992 universities

References

External links

 
South Wales
Education in Newport, Wales
University Alliance
2013 establishments in Wales
Educational institutions established in 2013
Universities established in the 21st century
Chiropractic schools in the United Kingdom
Universities and colleges formed by merger in the United Kingdom
Organisations based in Newport, Wales
Law schools in Wales
Universities UK